The men's 400 metres hurdles event at the 1978 Commonwealth Games was held on 8 and 10 August at the Commonwealth Stadium in Edmonton, Alberta, Canada.

Medalists

Results

Heats
Held on 8 August

Qualification: First 4 in each heat (Q) and the next 4 fastest (q) qualify for the semifinals.

Semifinals
Held on 8 August

Qualification: First 4 in each semifinal (Q) qualify directly for the final.

Final
Held on 10 August

References

Heats & Semifinals results (The Canberra Times)
Final results (The Canberra Times)
Australian results

Athletics at the 1978 Commonwealth Games
1978